'Club Baloncesto Conquero', is a Spanish women's basketball club based in Huelva, that currently plays in the Liga Femenina de Baloncesto.

History
Created in 1999 from the merge of local clubs CB Gilest and CB Ciudad de Huelva, in 2008 it reached the second category and in 2012 it was promoted to the Spanish top division.

In February 2016, Conquero won its first national title after defeating Perfumerías Avenida by 70–62 in the final of the Copa de la Reina.

In July 2016, after finishing in the third position of the season, the club was expelled from the Liga Femenina due to its debts. After this decision, the club decided to register in the third tier while it waits for a judicial verdict about its expelling.

Season by season

Notable former players
 Radostina Dimitrova
 Tanya Bröring
 Joanna Walich
 Lidia Mirchandani
 Rosó Buch
 Bernice Mosby
 Kaitlin Sowinski

References

External links
Official website

Women's basketball teams in Spain
Basketball teams established in 1999
Liga Femenina de Baloncesto teams
Basketball teams in Andalusia
Sport in Huelva
1999 establishments in Spain